Garra jerdoni is a species of ray-finned fish in the family Cyprinidae. The species is endemic to India. It is sometimes considered conspecific with Garra mcclellandi.

References

Fish described in 1867
Cyprinid fish of Asia
Garra